Blanca Rosa Vílchez is a Peruvian-born Hispanic journalist in the United States. She has resided in New York City since 1984.

Biography
Blanca Rosa Vílchez studied at the National University of San Marcos, the oldest university in the Americas.

Her journalism career began in Lima, Peru in 1973. She was the first female news director in her native country when at the age of 22, she directed 90 Segundos (90 Seconds) a daily newscast.

She has been reporting for Univision since 1987 from New York.

She is known for her coverage of the terrorist attack on September 11, 2001 against the Twin Towers. Images have been captured of her running from the towers as they collapsed behind her. Her coverage of this story earned her an honorable mention from the Academy of Science and Television. In 2019, she donated the blouse and jacket that she wore while covering the attacks to the National Museum of American History.

She is the senior national correspondent from New York on Noticiero Univision, the newscast most viewed by Latino Americans. The newscast reaches 95% of Hispanic Americans living in the United States with nearly three million viewers every night.

References

External links
Una Peruana "En Las Torres"
Video: Noticiero Univision 

Living people
Hispanic and Latino American women journalists
American television journalists
American women television journalists
Year of birth missing (living people)
Peruvian emigrants to the United States
20th-century American journalists
21st-century American journalists
National University of San Marcos alumni
20th-century American women
21st-century American women